This is a list of TV episodes for the History Channel reality TV series Ice Road Truckers.

Series overview

Episodes

Season 1 (2007)

Season 2 (2008)

Season 3 (2009)

Season 4 (2010)

Season 5 (2011)

Season 6 (2012)

Season 7 (2013)

Season 8 (2014)

Season 9 (2015)

Season 10 (2016)

Season 11 (2017)

Home and International Releases

See also
 Ice Road Truckers
 Ice Pilots

References 

 

Lists of American reality television series episodes
Lists of American non-fiction television series episodes